Bounkiling Department is one of the 45 departments of Senegal, one of the three making up the Sédhiou Region.  It was created in 2008 along with the Sédhiou Region, which was formerly part of the Kolda Region.

The department has two communes: Bounkiling and Madina Wandifa.

The rural districts (communautés rurales) comprise:
 Arrondissement of Boghal:
 Boghal
 Tankon
 Ndiamacouta
 Arrondissement of Bona:
 Bona
 Diacounda
 Inor
 Kandiong Mangana
 Arrondissement of Diaroumé
 Diaroumé
 Diambati
 Faoune

Departments of Senegal
Sédhiou Region